Sir Ellice Victor Sassoon, 3rd Baronet,  (20 December 1881 – 13 August 1961) was a businessman and hotelier from the wealthy Baghdadi Jewish Sassoon merchant and banking family.

Biography

Sir Ellice Victor Elias Sassoon was born 20 (some sources cite 30) December 1881 in Naples, Kingdom of Italy while his family was en route to India. He was raised in England where he attended Harrow and Trinity College, Cambridge. He was from a Baghdadi Jewish family which dealt successfully in all sorts of commodities like precious metals, silks, gums, spices, wool and wheat. But, later, it specialised in trading Indian cotton yarn and opium from Bombay to China. 

Sir Victor served in the Royal Flying Corps in the First World War. He survived a plane crash in 1916 and sustained leg injuries that plagued him for the rest of his life. When his father died in 1924, Victor inherited his title and became 3rd Baronet of Bombay. He moved to India, where he managed his family's textile mills and served in the Indian Legislative Assembly.

In the 1920s and 1930s, he transferred much of his wealth from India to Shanghai, China and contributed to a real estate boom there by investing millions of US dollars in the local economy. Sir Victor frequently travelled worldwide for business and pleasure and divided his time between Poona, India and Shanghai. He acquired the Cathay Land Company, the Cathay Hotel Company and at least 50 other companies. Sassoon built the Cathay Hotel (now the Peace Hotel) in 1929, and other large hotels, office buildings and residences, many in The Bund, a waterfront area in central Shanghai (including Hamilton House, Metropole Hotel and Embankment). At one time, he owned over 1,800 properties there. Sassoon endeavored to protect Western interests in the Orient and helped European Jews survive in the Shanghai Ghetto.

Sassoon loved photography and opened a studio in Shimla first called Hamilton Studios. In 1928 he established his hobby and opened a studio in Bombay State at Ballard Estate by the same name as Hamilton Studios at E.D.Sassoon Building (one of his property), Ballard Estate, and all the negatives from Shimla were brought here, to Bombay, closing down that studio completely. He was also fond of horse racing, Chinese ivories (his vast collection was eventually bequeathed to the British Museum in 2018), international friendships and travel. He counted members of the aristocracy and such Hollywood stars as Charlie Chaplin, Marlene Dietrich, Basil Rathbone and Bette Davis among his acquaintances. An accomplished photographer, he made many images of friends, and of local and foreign landscapes and created numerous photograph albums. He also illustrated his diaries with his own photographs.

He lived in Shanghai until 1941, when due to China's war with Japan, he was forced to leave. After the Chinese Communist Revolution of 1949, he sold his business interests in China and relocated to Nassau, Bahamas.

During the 1950s, Sassoon lived at his home on Cable Beach in Nassau. He also spent time in the remote town of Hillsboro, New Mexico, located about a three-hour drive north of El Paso, Texas. He built a house there and named it El Refugio. It has since been turned into a Bed and Breakfast.

Late in life he married his American nurse, Evelyn "Barnsie" Barnes, who remained in Nassau long after Sassoon's death in 1961. Lady Sassoon continued to provide support for the charity founded by her late husband to help Bahamian children, by hosting the black-tie Heart Ball each year over the Valentine's Day weekend.

E. D. Sassoon & Co.

On the death of his father in 1924, Sir Victor Sassoon inherited the trading house "E.D. Sassoon & Co. Limited". Set up in 1867, it had offices in Bombay (India) and Shanghai (China) and interests in Persian Gulf ports, Baghdad and Japan. The Company ran cotton mills in India and invested in property in the Far East. In 1928 Sir Victor Sassoon established the "E.D. Sassoon Banking Company Limited" as a subsidiary of "E. D. Sassoon and Company Limited", to coordinate the trading interests of his family.

In March 1930, E.D. Sassoon and Company Limited's new headquarters were opened at "Sassoon House" in Shanghai. The Second World War brought many changes to the E.D. Sassoon Group. Despite successful production rates, the firm decided to dispose of the mills in Bombay in 1943, fearing problems as foreign owners once independence was granted. In May 1949, Shanghai was under the control of a communist regime and seemed an unhealthy place for the company's head office, so this was transferred to Nassau in the Bahamas in 1950. It is thought that Nassau was chosen because there were no forms of personal or corporation tax in place and Sir Victor Sassoon planned to live there, which he did until his death in 1961.

"E.D. Sassoon Banking Company Limited" was bought by the merchant bank "Wallace Brothers and Company (Holding)" in 1972, which in turn was taken over by the Standard Chartered Bank in 1976. The other parts of the "Sassoon Group" and the "Sir Victor Sassoon Heart Foundation", set up by Lady Sassoon after her husband's death, are run from Nassau, where the family still lives.

Woodditton Stud

A fan of thoroughbred horse racing, Sir Victor Sassoon owned a highly successful stable of horses that won numerous prestigious races in the United Kingdom. In 1925, he purchased the Bungalow Stud, founded 1851 in Cambridgeshire not far from the Newmarket Racecourse. He renamed it Eve Stud Ltd. as he was known to his intimates as 'Eve' - a contraction of his first two names, Ellice Victor. The mastermind behind Sir Victor's racing success in Britain was trainer Sir Noel Murless who became manager of Eve Stud in 1952.

He purchased the property from Sir Victor's widow in 1970 and gave it the name Woodditton Stud. Sir Noel continued the practice of standing stallions there, including the top-class racehorses Connaught and Welsh Pageant. The stallion tradition was maintained when the stud was purchased again in 1981 by Mr Yong Nam-Seng of Singapore, being home to Damister and, for a short time, his champion son Celtic Swing, as well as Bin Ajwaad, Superlative and Sayf el Arab. After 20 years of ownership, during which time he expanded the stud to 185 acres, Mr Yong Nam-Seng, a steward of the Singapore Jockey Club and former chairman of the Australasian Racing Conference, sold Woodditton Stud in November 2001 to its present owner Darley Stud Management and it is now used as a rest and recuperation facility.

Sassoon purchased Beech House Stud from Martin H. Benson in 1960 and along with Eve Stud it became part of Sassoon Studs Incorporated managed by Murless. Sassoon's wife sold the Sassoon Studs to Louis Freedman in 1971.

Among Sir Victor Sassoon's stables' significant performances were wins in The Derby (Pinza, Crepello, Hard Ridden, St. Paddy), Epsom Oaks (Exhibitionnist), 1,000 Guineas (Exhibitionnist, Honeylight), 2,000 Guineas (Crepello), St. Leger Stakes (St Paddy) and King George VI and Queen Elizabeth Stakes (Pinza).

Family

On the death of his father, Sir Edward Elias Sassoon, in 1924, Sir Victor Sassoon became the 3rd Baronet of Bombay. Late in life, in 1959, he married his American nurse, Evelyn Barnes ("Barnsie"). He had no issue and the baronetcy became extinct.

He was related by marriage to the Mocatta family and he himself was a Sephardic Jew. One of his former employees, Lawrence Kadoorie (later the Lord Kadoorie), later founded the Hong Kong-based utility company China Light and Power. One of his right-hand men in Shanghai was Gordon Currie who was put into a concentration camp by the Japanese and remained there for several years.

Honours and awards

 Knight Grand Cross of the Order of the British Empire, dated 1 January 1947
 Sassoon Road in Pok Fu Lam, a residential area on Hong Kong Island in Hong Kong, is named in his honour
 On 11 February 2011, the Bahamas Postal Service issued four commemorative postage stamps to highlight the 50th anniversary of the Victor Sassoon Heart Foundation. One of them portrays Sir Victor Sassoon.

See also

Sassoon family
David Sassoon & Co.

References

External links

 Legend of the Sassoons
 Sir Ellice Victor Elias Sassoon papers and photographs, DeGolyer Library, Southern Methodist University

1881 births
1961 deaths
People educated at Harrow School
Alumni of Trinity College, Cambridge
Baronets in the Baronetage of the United Kingdom
British Army personnel of World War I
British hoteliers
British Sephardi Jews
Indian photographers
British racehorse owners and breeders
Businesspeople from Shanghai
Chinese real estate businesspeople
Jewish Chinese history
Knights Grand Cross of the Order of the British Empire
Owners of Epsom Derby winners
Royal Flying Corps officers
Victor
British people of Indian-Jewish descent
Baghdadi Jews
Asian Sephardi Jews
British emigrants to the Bahamas